The 1979 European Curling Championships were held from November 18 to 24 at the Palaghiaccio arena in Varese, Italy.

The Scottish men's team won their first European title, and the Swiss women's team won their first European title.

For the first time, the men's team of Wales took part in the European Championship.

Men's

Teams

Round robin

  Teams to playoffs
  Teams to tiebreaker

Tiebreaker

Playoffs

Final standings

Women's

Teams

Round robin

  Team to final
  Teams to semifinal

Playoffs

Final standings

References

European Curling Championships, 1979
European Curling Championships, 1979
European Curling Championships
Curling competitions in Italy
International sports competitions hosted by Italy
European Curling Championships
European Curling Championships
European Curling Championships
20th century in Lombardy